Bum Krüger (born Willy Krüger; 13 March 1906 - 15 March 1971) was a German actor. He appeared in more than one hundred films from 1948 to 1969.

Filmography

References

External links 

1906 births
1971 deaths
German male film actors
German male television actors
Male actors from Berlin
20th-century German male actors